Klara Bramfeldt (born 20 July 1979) is a Swedish former competitive figure skater. She is a three-time (1999–2001) Swedish national champion and three-time Nordic bronze medalist. She reached the free skate at three ISU Championships – the 1996 Junior Worlds in Brisbane, 1997 Junior Worlds in Seoul, and 1999 Europeans in Prague. She placed 33rd in her only appearance at the World Figure Skating Championships, in 1999.

Programs

Results

References

External links 
 

Swedish female single skaters
1979 births
Living people
Sportspeople from Norrköping
20th-century Swedish women